Yantai CIMC Raffles Shipyard is a shipbuilding company in Yantai, Shandong Province, People's Republic of China. The shipyard is one of three operated by CIMC Raffles Offshore Ltd.

Yantai Raffles specializes in offshore and marine fabrication, and shares in the company have been traded on the Oslo OTC system in Norway since May 2006.

In 1994, Brian Chang, a Singaporean of South African descent, founded Yantai Raffles at the junction of Bohai Bay and the Yellow Sea. The shipyard is in close proximity to Korea and Japan, an area that accounts for 80% of the global shipbuilding capacity. YRS is the only shipyard in China to be majority foreign-owned. It has agreed to acquire 100% of the Sanlian Longkou shipyard in Shandong, China.

Since March 2013, it has been a wholly own subsidiary of CIMC.

History 
Chang founded Yantai Raffles Offshore Limited (YRS) in 1994. Previously, he had worked with various companies in Singapore and Malaysia in the marine industry, including Mobil, Jardine Offshore, M.J Batty and Far East Shipyard (now known as Keppel FELS) between 1965 and 1970. In 1971, he started his own company, Promet (now known as PPL), which grew in size over his decade-long tenure. He has worked for 40 years in the shipbuilding and marine fabrication sector, overseeing more than 600 marine construction projects.

Yantai Raffles became known as CIMC Raffles after CIMC invested in the company. By March 2013, CIMC had acquired all outstanding shares of CIMC Raffles. It will now become an subsidiary of CIMC Offshore Holdings Co., Ltd.

Types of vessels built 

Semi-submersible drilling rig
Jack-up drilling rig
Platform conversion
Platform supply vessel
Anchor handling tug supply vessel
Heavy lift varrier
Floating, production, storage and offloading Vessel (FPSO)
Mono-hull circular column FPSO
Floating, production and offloading vessel (FPO)
Pipelay vessel
Fallpipe vessel
Semi-submersible bare deck vessel

Yard facilities 
72-hectare shipyard 
Building facilities
World's largest gantry crane with lifting capacity of 20,000 metric tonnes
One of the world's largest dry docks (L430m x W120m x D14m)
One of the world's largest land-based pedestal crane
2 X 370 metric tonnes gantry cranes 
Fully automated warehouse, with a capacity of 4,000 pallets

World's largest crane 
Taisun, the world's largest gantry crane, with a lifting capacity of 20,000 metric tonnes, took over seven years to plan and an additional 12 months for the preparation of its design framework. It was designed by Dalian Huarui Heavy Industry Group Co., Ltd (DHHI)

The crane, capable of muscling up to 10,000 cars in one lift, allows the mating of an entire outfitted deck box of a semi-submersible rig onto its hull/pontoons in one single operation. The shipyard states that this will reduce work hazards at high altitudes and in the open sea. The lifting of the complete deck box reduces man-hours by as much as half.

References

External links 
 Yantai Raffles Shipyard website
 Oslo OTC Stock Exchange
 Video: Construction of the world's largest crane Taisun, Youtube

Shipbuilding companies of China
Companies based in Shandong
Manufacturing companies established in 1994
China Merchants
Chinese companies established in 1994